The Nigerian national beach soccer team represents Nigeria in international beach soccer competitions and is controlled by the Nigeria Football Federation, the governing body for football in Nigeria.

Competitive record

World Cup record

Africa Beach Soccer Cup of Nations record

Team honours and achievements
Intercontinental
FIFA Beach Soccer World Cup
Quarterfinals: 2006, 2011 

BSWW Tour - Copa Lagos
Winners: 2011, 2012, 2013
Runners-up: 2019

Continental
 Africa Beach Soccer Cup of Nations
Winners: 2009, 2007
Runners-up: 2006, 2011, 2016, 2018  
Third-place: 2015
Fourth-place: 2013

Current squad
For BSWW Tour - Copa Lagos 2019

Head coach:  Audu Adamu

References

External links
FIFA.com profile

Beach soccer
African national beach soccer teams
Football in Nigeria